= Yutaka Giken Co., Ltd. =

Japanese multinational automotive components manufacturer

- Native name: 株式会社ユタカ技研
- Romanized name: Kabushiki Gaisha Yutaka Giken
- Type: Public (K.K.)
- Industry: Automotive
- Founded: December 11, 1986; 39 years ago
- Headquarters: Hamamatsu, Shizuoka, Japan
- Area served: Worldwide
- Total assets: ¥1,754 million (2015)
- Number of employees: 963 (2016)
- Website: www.yutakagiken.co.jp/en/index.html

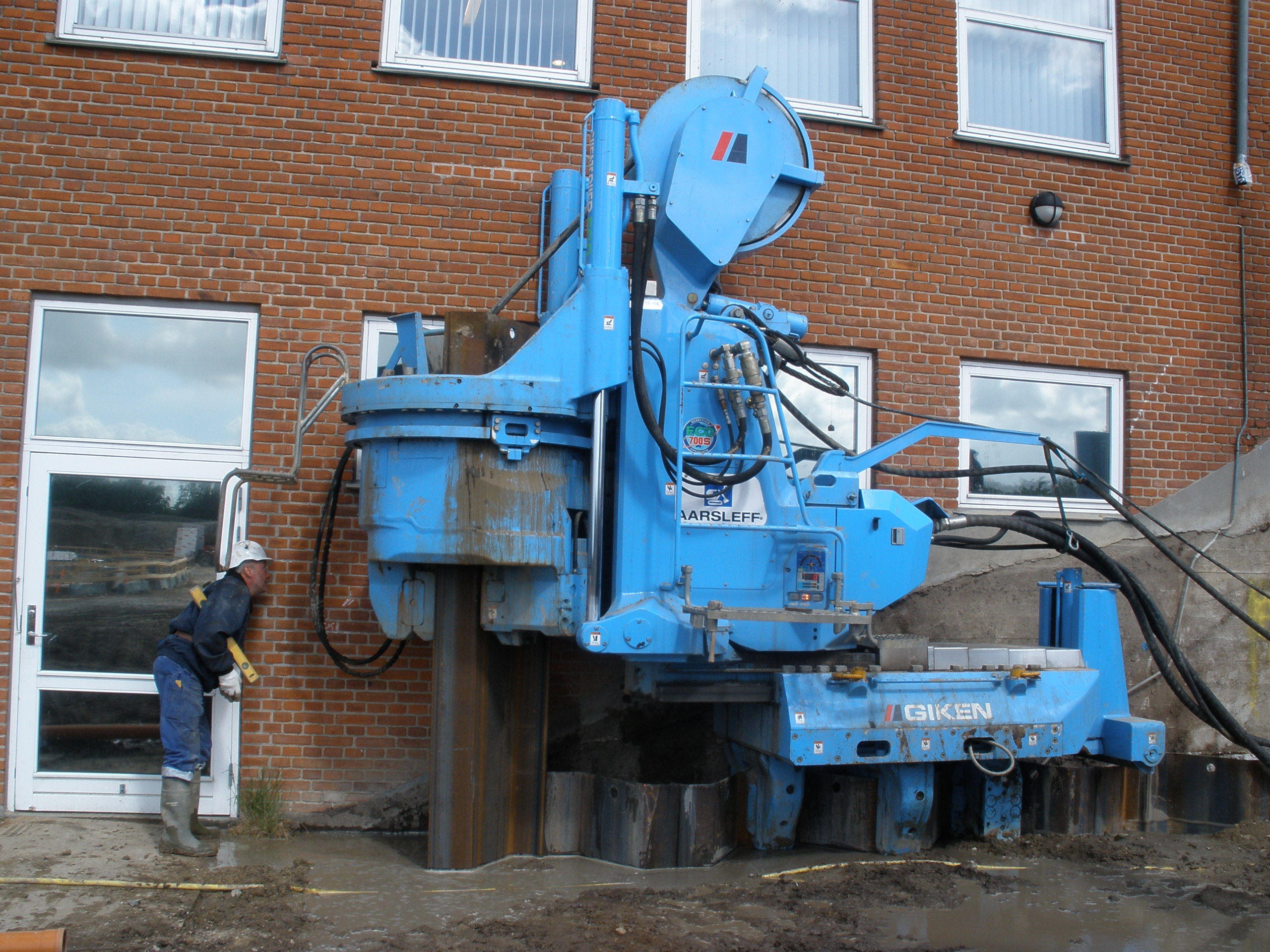
Silent Piler ECO 700S of Yutaka Giken Co., Ltd.

Yutaka Giken Co., Ltd. (Japanese: 株式会社ユタカ技研, Hepburn: Kabushiki gaisha Yutaka Giken) is a Japanese multinational automotive components manufacturer headquartered in Hamamatsu, Shizuoka, Japan. They specialize in torque converters, catalytic converters, exhaust systems and brake systems. There are five locations in Japan including three plants, one R&D facility and a head office. Affiliates include Sumirex Co., Ltd. and Shinnichi Industries Co., Ltd. Overseas, Yutaka operates 12 facilities in 9 countries. FY 2015 net sales were ¥165.3 billion.
